Recoules-de-Fumas is a commune in the Lozère department in southern France.

Geography
The river Colagne forms most of the commune's eastern border.

See also
Communes of the Lozère department

References

Recoulesdefumas